Andrés Augusto Mehring (born 19 April 1994) is an Argentine professional footballer who plays as a goalkeeper for Central Córdoba.

Club career
Mehring began his career with Argentino de Franck, which preceded a move to Colón. He would play with Colón's first-team for three years, initially appearing on the substitutes twice during 2012–13 in the Argentine Primera División; but went unused. In 2015, he was an unused sub fifteen times prior to making his professional debut for Colón against Nueva Chicago on 12 July. It was his only appearance in the campaign as he was on the bench a further thirteen times. July 2016 saw Mehring join Primera B Nacional's Guillermo Brown. He was selected in thirty-nine league fixtures in his first season, missing the other five due to injury.

He had suffered a knee injury during his final match of 2016–17 versus Brown, which meant Mehring missed the following season. He left Guillermo Brown in 2018, subsequently having a short spell with former youth club Argentino de Franck in Liga Esperancina. Months later, on 10 June, Argentine Primera División side Godoy Cruz signed Mehring. He appeared fourteen times in all competitions for the club. In January 2020, Mehring headed to Uruguay with Liverpool. His debut arrived on 2 February in the Supercopa Uruguaya, as they defeated Nacional to win the trophy. He left at the end of 2020, after nineteen games.

International career
Mehring represented Argentina at U20 level, being selected in squads for the 2012 Cape Town International Challenge and the 2013 South American Youth Football Championship.

Career statistics
.

Honours
Liverpool
 Supercopa Uruguaya: 2020

References

External links

1994 births
Living people
Argentine people of German descent
People from Las Colonias Department
Argentine footballers
Argentina youth international footballers
Argentina under-20 international footballers
Association football goalkeepers
Argentine expatriate footballers
Expatriate footballers in Uruguay
Argentine expatriate sportspeople in Uruguay
Argentine Primera División players
Primera Nacional players
Uruguayan Primera División players
Club Atlético Colón footballers
Guillermo Brown footballers
Godoy Cruz Antonio Tomba footballers
Liverpool F.C. (Montevideo) players
Sportspeople from Santa Fe Province